The Governor (German: Der Gouverneur) is a 1939 German drama film directed by Viktor Tourjansky and starring Brigitte Horney, Willy Birgel and Hannelore Schroth. It is based on the play Die Fahne by Emmerich Groh.

The film's sets were designed by the art director Max Mellin. It was shot at the Babelsberg and Tempelhof Studios in Berlin and on location in East Prussia. It was produced on a budget of 715,000 Reichsmarks.

Synopsis
In a fictional Scandinavian country, a high-ranking military officer decides to overthrow Parliament. Salvation in the party turmoil is the military dictatorship under the resolute governor General Werkonen. The new deputy ensures that an assassination attempt is carried out on them. However, the general is only slightly injured when it is executed. The hired assassin now feels abandoned by his employer and takes revenge by killing him.

The suspicion of murder falls on the young guards officer, Lieutenant Robert Runeberg, the son of the former landowner, who probably had a motive because of the alleged forgery of his father's bills. And that very officer cannot reveal his alibi; because said alibi is a simultaneous conversation with his childhood friend Maria, the current wife of the military governor, and he doesn't want to compromise her. While everyone involved is still struggling with questions of conscience, the guards officer is about to grab his pistol and the governor is about to resign, the real murderer turns up in good time. With that, all honor and especially the honor of the body regiment is saved.

Cast
 Brigitte Horney as Maria 
 Willy Birgel as General Werkonen 
 Hannelore Schroth as Ebba 
 Ernst von Klipstein as Leutnant Robert Runeberg 
 Rolf Weih as Leutnant Kalminen 
 Walter Franck as Dr. Erko 
 Paul Bildt as Gutsbesitzer Runeberg 
 Lotte Spira as Frau Runeberg 
 Werner Pledath as Oberst Wantua 
 Albert Florath as Oberst Perkaulen 
 Paul Otto as Ministerpräsident Lönnrot 
 Ingolf Kuntze as Gutsbesitzer Maris 
 Karl-Heinz Peters as Tom Lynge 
 F.W. Schröder-Schrom as General Borgas 
 Karl Meixner as Diener bei Dr. Erko 
 Nicolas Koline as Jan, Koch in Marias Elternhaus 
 Valy Arnheim as Diener bei General Werkonen 
 Franz Arzdorf as Zivilist im Gefolge des Staatspräsidenten 
 Charly Berger as Offizier im Gefolge
 Reinhold Bernt as Mitglied der Radikalen Partei 
 Theo Brandt as Junger Offizier 
 Fritz Eckert as Ein weiterer Offizier 
 Max Harry Ernst as Parlamentsmitglied 
 Charles Francois as Parlamentsmitglied  
 Fred Goebel as Offizier der Polizeiwache 
 Otto F. Henning as Stabsarzt 
 Alfred Karen as Parlamentsmitglied 
 Hans Kettler as Polizeikommissar am Tatort 
 Otto Klopsch as Polizeikommissar 
 Ida Krill as Küchenhilfe bei Maria 
 Heinrich Marlow as Staatspräsident 
 Max Mensing as Regierungsmitglied 
 Klaus Pohl as Mann am Bahnhof, der sich eine Zigarette anzündet 
 Georg A. Profé as Offizier 
 Arthur Reinhardt as Limonadenverkäufer am Bahnsteig 
 Ferdinand Robert as Gast beim Empfang des Gouverneurs 
 Walter Schramm-Duncker as Gast auf Gut Marias 
 Otz Tollen as Stabsoffizier des Fahnenregiments 
 Elisabeth von Ruets as Gast beim Empfang des Gouverneurs 
 Erich Walter as Polizeipräfekt 
 Borwin Walth as Diener beim Empfang 
 Eduard Wenck as Zeitschriftenverkäufer am Bahnsteig 
 Kurt Wieschala as Regierungsmitglied

References

Bibliography 
 Waldman, Harry. Nazi Films in America, 1933–1942. McFarland, 2008.

External links 
 

1939 films
1939 drama films
German drama films
Films of Nazi Germany
1930s German-language films
Films directed by Victor Tourjansky
Terra Film films
German black-and-white films
Films shot at Babelsberg Studios
Films shot at Tempelhof Studios
Films set in Europe
1930s German films